Lensgreve is the name of the highest noble rank in Denmark, and refers to a count (greve) holding an estate with the status of a (len) county. They rank above ordinary (titular) counts, and their position in the Danish aristocracy as the highest-ranking noblemen is broadly comparable to that of dukes in other European countries.

The rank was introduced in 1671 by a regulation establishing counties and baronies.

References 

Danish noble titles